Mirette Investigates (French: Les enquêtes de Mirette) (Catalan: Les investigacións de la Mirette) is an animated series based on a series of picture books by the author Fanny Joly and published by Éditions Sarbacane. Laurent Audouin illustrated the books, which debuted in 2008. The show premiered on TF1's TFOU on 6 November 2016, and is billed as the "first travelling detective comedy".

Premise
The show revolves on the international adventures of a young French detective named Mirette and her talking feline assistant Jean-Pat as they travel with Mirette's travel-agent father and solve mysteries.

Characters
Mirette: An eleven-year-old girl who wants to be the world's greatest detective under the age of twelve. She prefers using traditional technology to solve mysteries.
Jean-Pat: A tech-savvy and lazy cat who is Mirette's main partner in their adventures.
Detective Mollo: A detective who has an unreliable performance in his job.
Sophie Scoop: A thirteen-year-old girl who is Mirette's best friend and wants to be a news reporter. She is also the number one fan of Jean-Pat.
The Grand Vilain International (GVI): The only member of the FPECTRE secret organization, he wants to turn the world into a giant minigolf course and attempts to harm Mirette. He has a dog named Gérard.

Production
Mirette Investigates was one of the projects pitched at the European animation event Cartoon Forum in 2013. Production began in October 2014. It was produced by Cyber Group Studios and KD Productions.

Release
The show was sold to TF1 and Canal+ (France), TV3 (Catalonia), WDR (Germany), Teletoon+ (Poland), Sveriges Television (Sweden), RTS (Switzerland), Minimax (Central Europe), and VRT (Belgium). In June 2016, Studio 100 announced it acquired the DVD and VoD rights to Mirette Investigates in German-speaking territories.

Interactive features
Cyber Group founder Pierre Sissman said the show would have webisodes and websites, and tablet games requiring clues from the television series for solving investigations.

References

External links
Official site 
Mirette Investigates TF1 website 
Catalan Films & TV page
Cyber Group Studios page
KP Productions page
Le blog de Mirette 
Mirette Investigates YouTube Channel
Les Enquêtes de Mirette YouTube Channel 

2010s French animated television series
2016 French television series debuts
French children's animated adventure television series
French children's animated comedy television series
French children's animated fantasy television series
French children's animated mystery television series
Spanish children's animated adventure television series
Spanish children's animated comedy television series
Spanish children's animated fantasy television series
Spanish children's animated mystery television series
Animated detective television series
French-language television shows
TF1 original programming
French television shows based on children's books
Animated television series about cats
Animated television series about children